Methylarsonic acid is an organoarsenic compound with the formula CH3AsO3H2.  It is a colorless, water-soluble solid.  Salts of this compound, e.g. disodium methyl arsonate, have been widely used in as herbicides and fungicides in growing cotton and rice.

Reactions
Near physiological pH, methanearsonic acid converts to its conjugate bases, the methylarsonates.

Synthesis and biosynthesis
Reaction of arsenous acid with methyl iodide gives methylarsonic acid.  This historically significant conversion is called the Meyer reaction:
As(OH)3 + CH3I  +  NaOH  → CH3AsO(OH)2  + NaI  +  H2O
The then-novel aspect of the reaction was that alkylation occurs at arsenic, leading to oxidation of arsenic from oxidation state +3 to +5.

The biomethylation of arsenic compounds is thought to start with the formation of methanearsonates.  Thus, trivalent arsenic compounds are methylated to give methanearsonate. S-Adenosylmethionine is the methyl donor.  The methanearsonates are the precursors to cacodylates, again by the cycle of reduction (to methylarsonous acid) followed by a second methylation.

Safety
Like most arsenic compounds, it is highly toxic.

References

Arsonic acids